Events from the year 1682 in the Kingdom of Scotland.

Incumbents

 Monarch – Charles II

Judiciary 
 Lord President of the Court of Session – Sir David Falconer from 5 June
 Lord Justice General – George Gordon, 1st Earl of Aberdeen; James Drummond, 4th Earl of Perth
 Lord Justice Clerk – Sir Richard Maitland

Events 
 11 February – William Douglas is elevated to the rank of Marquess of Queensberry in the Peerage of Scotland.
 Advocates Library is founded as the law library of the Faculty of Advocates in Edinburgh.
 Chair of Professor of Humanity created at the University of Glasgow.
 Probable date – Inuit seen in Orkney.
 Ongoing – The Killing Time.

Births
 April – James Graham, 1st Duke of Montrose, nobleman and statesman (died 1742)
 June (in England) – Archibald Campbell, 3rd Duke of Argyll, nobleman, politician, lawyer, businessman and soldier (died 1761)
 24 October – William Aikman, portrait painter (died 1731)
 23 December – James Gibbs, architect (died 1754)

Deaths
 6 May (in wreck of HMS Gloucester)
 Robert Ker, 3rd Earl of Roxburghe (born c. 1658)
 Sir John Hope of Hopetoun
 24 August (in England) – John Maitland, 1st Duke of Lauderdale, politician (born 1616)
 David Leslie, 1st Lord Newark, cavalry officer (born c.1600)

See also

Timeline of Scottish history
 1682 in England

References

 
Years of the 17th century in Scotland